Laden may refer to:

Arabic name
As an Arabic male or female name, Laden or Ladan may refer to:
 Ladan Bijani, Iranian conjoined twin
 Ladan Mostofi, Iranian actress
 bin Laden family, used as a surname in the Western context, meaning son of "Laden"
 Osama bin Laden, Saudi founder of al-Qaeda

Other names
As a German surname, meaning shop, Laden may refer to:
 Greg Laden

Geography
 Ladan (urban-type settlement), an urban-type settlement in Chernivtsi Oblast of Ukraine

See also 
 Ladin (disambiguation)
 bin Laden (disambiguation)

Arabic unisex given names